G. Dewey and Elma Arndt House is a historic home located at Raleigh, North Carolina.  The house was built in 1960–1961, and is a Modernist style dwelling with a post, beam and deck structural system.  It features a wide, asymmetrical front-gable roof, and is set into the side of a slope.  The garage was converted to living space in 1988.  A two-car garage and shop were erected in place of the original carport in 2000.

It was listed on the National Register of Historic Places in December 2011.

References 

Houses on the National Register of Historic Places in North Carolina
Modernist architecture in North Carolina
Houses completed in 1961
Houses in Raleigh, North Carolina
National Register of Historic Places in Raleigh, North Carolina